Bernice J. is a Chesapeake Bay skipjack, built in 1904 in Young's Creek, Virginia, by W. Thomas Young of Parksley, who also built Claude W. Somers.  She is a  two-sail bateau, or "V"-bottomed deadrise type of centerboard sloop, commonly referred to as a skipjack.  She worked dredging oysters through the 1970s. She is located at Chestertown, Kent County, Maryland.
 
She was listed on the National Register of Historic Places in 1985.

References

Kent County, Maryland
Skipjacks
Ships on the National Register of Historic Places in Maryland
1904 ships
National Register of Historic Places in Kent County, Maryland